"Holler Back" is a song written by Stokes Nielson and Tim James, and recorded by American country music band The Lost Trailers.  The song is the band's fourth chart single on the Billboard Hot Country Songs charts, and their first Top 40 hit on that chart.  It was released in February 2008 as the title track and lead-off single to their album Holler Back, released in August 2008 on BNA Records.

Content
"Holler Back" is an up-tempo in which the narrator describes his feeling out of place in an urban setting. In the first verse, he mentions a friend who tells him to "holler back when [he gets] back home", although the narrator says that the only "holler back" that he knows is "that holler back in the woods". This line refers to the Southern American English word "holler", a slang term for a hollow or valley. In the second verse, he describes a woman named Mary Jo who lives in the hollow.

Critical reception
Jim Malec of The 9513 gave the song a "thumbs down" rating, as he thought that it "poke[d] fun" at Gwen Stefani's "Hollaback Girl", but since "Holler Back" was released three years after Stefani's song, he called it "an opportunity lost to very poor timing". He also called "Holler Back" "an incredibly tight track with a John Rich-worthy hook[…]which showcases guitarist Stokes Nielson's spot-on[…]under-appreciated songwriting talent."

Music video
The song's music video was directed by Tyson Wisbrock, and it was filmed at Calder Plaza in Grand Rapids, Michigan, during a concert. The main performance footage, however, was filmed in front of La Grande Vitesse, a sculpture by Alexander Calder, in Lansing, MI.

Chart performance
The song debuted at number 60 on the Hot Country Songs chart dated February 23, 2008, and fell from the chart the week after. However, it re-entered at number 48 on the chart dated March 15, 2008 and later entered Top Ten on the country charts dated for August 23, 2008. After thirty-one weeks on the chart, it reached a peak of number 9.

Year-end charts

References

2008 singles
2008 songs
The Lost Trailers songs
BNA Records singles
Song recordings produced by Brett Beavers
Songs written by Tim James (country music songwriter)